Ralph Waldo Sherwin (January 31, 1888 – May 17, 1963) was an American football player and coach. He played college football at Dartmouth College, playing left tackle. He served as the 14th head coach at the University of Kansas for a single season in 1911, compiling a record of 4–2–2. Sherwin was the head coach of the visiting team in the first American football homecoming game. He died on May 17, 1963, following a short illness, at his home in Dover, New Hampshire.

Head coaching record

References

1888 births
1963 deaths
American football tackles
Dartmouth Big Green football players
Kansas Jayhawks football coaches
Sportspeople from Fitchburg, Massachusetts
Players of American football from Massachusetts